Elizabeth Kitley is an American college basketball player for the Virginia Tech Hokies of the Atlantic Coast Conference (ACC).

Early life and high school career
Kitley grew up playing basketball, softball and volleyball, preferring softball by fifth grade. She switched her focus to basketball before her freshman year at Northwest Guilford High School in Greensboro, North Carolina, when she stood 6 ft 2 in (1.88 m). As a sophomore, Kitley led Northwest Guilford to its first state championship at the 4A tournament and was named most valuable player (MVP) of the title game. She helped her team win another state title in her junior season, repeating as MVP of the title game. Before her senior season, Kitley suffered a torn anterior cruciate ligament during an Amateur Athletic Union game. Following surgery, she was sidelined until the final two games of the season. Rated a five-star recruit by ESPN, she committed to play for Virginia Tech at the college level under head coach Kenny Brooks.

College career
On November 5, 2019, Kitley made her collegiate debut and scored a season-high 27 points, shooting 13-of-15 from the field, in a 105–41 win over Saint Francis (PA). She recorded the most points by a Virginia Tech freshman in a debut. As a freshman, Kitley averaged 12.5 points, 7.5 rebounds and 2.1 blocks per game and was named Atlantic Coast Conference (ACC) Freshman of the Year. On December 4, 2020, she posted a sophomore season-high 30 points and 11 rebounds in an 84–59 win against Appalachian State. On January 17, 2021, Kitley tied the program single-game record with 21 rebounds, while scoring 18 points in a 67–64 loss to Wake Forest. One week later, she scored 30 points for a second time, along with 13 rebounds, in an 89–87 loss to AP No. 2 NC State. Kitley averaged 18.2 points and 10.4 rebounds per game as a sophomore, earning first-team All-ACC honors.

On November 11, 2021, Kitley tallied 34 points and nine rebounds, making a program-record 17 field goals, in a 75–38 win over George Washington. On December 19, she posted 34 points and 13 rebounds in a 92–75 win against Florida State. Kitley sustained a right shoulder injury against North Carolina in the quarterfinals of the 2022 ACC tournament and was sidelined as her team lost to NC State in the following game. She returned for the first round of the NCAA tournament. During the game, Kitley set the Virginia Tech single-game scoring record with 42 points in an 84–81 loss to 12th-seeded Florida Gulf Coast. As a junior, she averaged 18.1 points, 9.8 rebounds and 2.4 blocks per game. Kitley was named ACC Player of the Year and repeated as a first-team All-ACC selection. She received third-team All-American recognition from the AP and United States Basketball Writers Association and was a member of the Women's Basketball Coaches Association All-America team.

Personal life
Kitley's father, Ralph, played professional basketball in Germany and Brazil following a college career at Wake Forest. He became a high school principal, teacher and basketball coach.

References

External links
Virginia Tech Hokies bio
USA Basketball bio

Living people
Year of birth missing (living people)
American women's basketball players
Basketball players from North Carolina
People from Summerfield, North Carolina
Centers (basketball)
Virginia Tech Hokies women's basketball players
All-American college women's basketball players